Heinrich Balasch was an Austrian cinematographer.

Selected filmography
 Dreyfus (1930)
 The False Millionaire (1931)
 The Trunks of Mr. O.F. (1931)
 Here's Berlin (1932)
 King of Hotels (1932)
 The Magic Top Hat (1932)
 Voices of Spring (1933)
 The Dream Car (1934)
 Shipwrecked Max (1936)

Bibliography
 Youngkin, Stephen. The Lost One: A Life of Peter Lorre. University Press of Kentucky, 2005.

External links

Year of birth missing
Year of death missing
Austrian cinematographers